Concrete Utopia is an upcoming South Korean disaster-thriller film directed by Um Tae-hwa and starring Lee Byung-hun, Park Seo-joon and Park Bo-young. The film is based on second part of webtoon Pleasant Bullying by Kim Sung-nik which is about an earthquake destruction and its aftermath. It is scheduled to be released theatrically in 2023.

Synopsis
It tells the story of earthquake survivors in 'Imperial Palace Apartment' in Seoul. Yeong-tak (Lee Byung-hun) leads the survivors in the crisis situation amply helped by Min-seong (Park Seo-joon), a public servant and his nurse wife Myeong-hwa (Park Bo-young).

Cast
 Lee Byung-hun as Yeong-tak
 Park Seo-joon as Min-seong, Myeong-hwa's husband who is a public servant
 Park Bo-young as Myeong-hwa, Min-seong's wife who is a nurse
 Park Ji-hu as Hye-won, a high school student survivor
 Kim Do-yoon as Do Kyun
 Kim Sun-young as Geum-ae, the daughter-in-law of the imperial palace apartment

Production

Casting
On August 4, 2020, Lotte Entertainment announced a disaster thriller film with Um Tae-hwa as director and Lee Byung-hun and Park Bo-young in pivotal roles. Park Seo-joon was also named to star in the film to be based on webtoon Pleasant Bullying by Kim Sung-nik. Park Ji-hu and Kim Do-yoon joined the cast in April 2021.

Filming
Principal photography began on April 16, 2021. The filming was finished in the end of August 2021.

Sequel
A sequel titled as Concrete Utopia 2, a dystopian action film that deals with a story long after the worldview of 'Concrete Utopia' began production on November 14, 2021. It will be the first feature film directed by Martial Arts Director Huh Myung-haeng, and features Ma Dong-seok. The sequel tentatively titled as The Wilderness includes Lee Jun-young and Roh Jeong-eui as lead cast.

References

External links
 
 
 

2020s Korean-language films
South Korean action thriller films
Upcoming films
Lotte Entertainment films
South Korean disaster films